, also known as Abnormal Physiology Seminar, is a Japanese comedy manga series written and illustrated by TAGRO and is a remake of his earlier manga series, . Hen Semi has been serialized in Kodansha's Monthly Morning Two manga magazine since 2006. It has been adapted into an original video animation in 2010, as well as an anime television series in 2011.

Plot
Nanako falls in love with Komugi and she joins a seminar which he enrolls, but the seminar is an abnormal seminar. Sexual harassment-like assignments and eccentric classmates confuse her.

Characters

Nanako is a normal university student, who happened to enroll in Abnormal Physiology Seminar. She tries to keep her mental state sound, but other abnormal classmates start to influence her personality...

Nanako has a crush on him. He is a handsome young man, and also a very straightforward person who is not afraid to discuss his perversions, much to the displeasure of others nearby. He also has a Netorare fetish.

Komugi's ex-girlfriend. She is a beautiful woman, but also a masochist and often gets lost in wild sexual fantasies.

A new student from Kanazawa, Ishikawa. She looks like a delinquent, but actually has a split personality. She was originally a sadist to her little brother.

A dissolute student who wants to be a manga artist. He is in a codependency relation with Makiko.

An elusive blonde student who is half British and half Japanese. She is an assistant of Yesterday.

A punk rock and otaku style student who films other people's perversions. He is also a mysophobe.

The seminar's professor. He looks like Kenji Eno.

Kenji's senpai who sometimes asks him for money despite being a wealthy man. He is famous for having developed an eroge. He looks like Yuji Horii. Miwako later dates him.

Media

Manga
Hentai Seiri Seminar appeared serially in 5 episodes in Wanimagazine's hentai manga magazine Comic Kairakuten, and it was contained on a collection of TAGRO's short stories in 2004 by Daitosha. Hen Semi was first serialized in Kondansha's seinen manga magazine Morning 2 in 2006. As of August 2011, 5 volumes have been released.

Original video animation
The first volume was released with the limited edition of volume four of the manga on July 23, 2010; and the second volume was released with the limited edition of volume five of the manga on March 23, 2011. The opening theme is "" by Nobuhiro Makino (composition and arrangement), Hitomi Mieno (lyrics), and Kana Hanazawa (vocals) and the ending theme is "" by Ataru Sumiyoshi (composition and arrangement), Hitomi Mieno (lyrics), and Kana Hanazawa, Minoru Shiraishi, Norihisa Mori, Takashi Matsuyama (vocals).

Anime television series
In December 2010, an anime television series adaptation of Hen Semi was announced on Kodansha's website. Produced by Xebec under the direction of Takao Kato and scripts by Takamitsu Kōno, the series began its broadcast between April 3 to July 3, 2011 on MBS. The duration of the episodes is half of that of a regular anime episode: 12 minutes instead of 24 minutes.

The opening theme is a non-lyric song "" by Masaru Yokoyama and the ending theme is "Punctuation!" by Hajime Kikuchi (composition and arrangement), Hitomi Mieno (lyrics), and Kana Hanazawa (vocals).

Internet radio show
A weekly internet radio show titled  began airing on March 15, 2011 on Animate TV. It is co-hosted by Minoru Shiraishi, Norihisa Mori and Takashi Matsuyama.

References

External links
  
  
 

Anime series based on manga
Comedy anime and manga
Kodansha manga
Seinen manga
IG Port franchises
Xebec (studio)